The 91st Regiment Illinois Volunteer Infantry was an infantry regiment that served in the Union Army during the American Civil War.

Service
The 91st Illinois Infantry was organized at Camp Butler, Illinois and mustered into Federal service on September 8, 1862.

The regiment was mustered out on June 12, 1865, and discharged at Chicago, Illinois, on June 28, 1865.

Total strength and casualties
The regiment suffered 12 enlisted men who were killed in action or who died of their wounds and 1 officer and 131 enlisted men who died of disease, for a total of 144 fatalities.

Commanders
Colonel Henry M. Day - Mustered out with the regiment.

See also
List of Illinois Civil War Units
Illinois in the American Civil War

Notes

References
The Civil War Archive

Units and formations of the Union Army from Illinois
1862 establishments in Illinois
Military units and formations established in 1862
Military units and formations disestablished in 1865